Dunfield is a local service district and designated place in the Canadian province of Newfoundland and Labrador. It is southwest of Catalina. It had a population of 222 in 1940, 193 in 1951 and 210 in 1956.  Renamed in 1913, the present day Dunfield was once the community of Cuckold's Cove.

Geography 
Dunfield is in Newfoundland within Subdivision J of Division No. 7.

Demographics 

Government 
Dunfield is a local service district (LSD) that is governed by a committee responsible for the provision of certain services to the community. The chair of the LSD committee is Vacant.

See also 
List of communities in Newfoundland and Labrador
List of designated places in Newfoundland and Labrador
List of local service districts in Newfoundland and Labrador

References 

Populated coastal places in Canada
Designated places in Newfoundland and Labrador
Local service districts in Newfoundland and Labrador